Quantum turbulence involves the chaotic dynamics of many interacting quantum vortices. In bulk superfluid, quantum turbulent states form a complex tangle of highly excited vortex lines. By introducing tight confinement along one direction the Kelvin wave excitations can be strongly suppressed, favouring vortex alignment with the axis of tight confinement. Vortex dynamics enters a regime of effective 2D motion, equivalent to point vortices moving on a plane. In general, 2D quantum turbulence (2DQT) can exhibit complex phenomenology involving coupled vortices and sound in compressible superfluids. The quantum vortex dynamics can exhibit signatures of turbulence including a Kolmogorov −5/3 power law, a quantum manifestation of the inertial transport of energy to large scales observed in classical fluids, known as an inverse energy cascade.

Point vortices
The point vortex model, introduced by Helmholtz and Kirchhoff, describes the motion of ideal point vortices confined to a plane, with direct mapping to planar electrodynamics. The model plays a central role in the study of planar Navier-Stokes flows, and can be realized in compressible superfluids such as those in ultracold gas Bose-Einstein condensates, when the healing length setting the vortex core size is very small compared to the system size.

Negative temperature
Point vortices confined to finite area were predicted by Onsager to exhibit states of negative temperature. This possibility of negative absolute temperature can be traced to the finite phase space of the point vortex system: in contrast to a massive particle moving on a plane, each point vortex only has two degrees of freedom. Specifying the spatial coordinates of the vortex also completely determines the superfluid velocity. At leading order a quantum vortex is massless, with each filament moving with the net background flow and obeying a form of the Biot–Savart law. Guiding-centre plasmas exhibit a symmetry breaking transition at high energy per vortex associated with negative temperature. In Bose-Einstein condensates the annihilation of vortex dipoles can raise the energy per vortex until the system undergoes spontaneous ordering into macroscopic same-sign vortex clusters associated with negative temperature. Clustered equilibrium states have high energy per vortex, with clusters forming as a consequence of the limited phase space of confined point vortices.

Forced turbulence
Vortices can be injected into a planar superfluid through various forcing mechanisms such as obstacle dragging or elliptical stirring that induce a localized breakdown of superfluidity, or through mechanisms that exploit abrupt phase evolution at the merging of multiple condensates or the condensate phase transition itself.

Small-scale forcing from appropriately dragging an obstacle can inject small vortex clusters into a planar superfluid.
In strongly non-equilibrium quantum fluid dynamics, clustered states can develop as a result of steady inverse energy cascade from small scale forcing, leading to an accumulation of energy at the system scale in the form of macroscopic flow due to vortex charge ordering.

Superfluid experiments
Advances in quantum fluids experiments have provided access to the point vortex regime in compressible superfluids. 2DQT regime has been established in ultracold gases, superfluid helium, and in exciton-polariton condensates comprising quantum fluids of light.
Negative temperature states predicted by Onsager have recently been observed in systems with hard-wall boundary conditions.

References

Turbulence
Superfluidity